End of Days is the seventh studio album by English hardcore punk band Discharge, released on 29 April 2016 by Nuclear Blast.

Reception and legacy 
End of Days, Discharge's seventh studio album, was released on 29 April 2016 through Nuclear Blast Records and entered the Official UK Rock Albums Chart at number 10 and the Independent Album Chart at number 23. It would be Discharge's first album with singer Jeff "JJ" Janiak and their first album as a five-piece band. The band toured Europe and did a USA tour with Eyehategod and Toxic Holocaust. MetalBlast gave the album a positive review, stating that it "...showcases everything about the band that has earned them their legendary status. The guitar work is fast and brutal, that famous D-beat drumming pattern is in full effect, and the vocals are a gruff, angry bark." The review states that the "songs are short, violent bursts of punk rock fury, brimming with an energy" with "a real sense of menace and sincerity in the tone" and it is "relentless from start to finish". The production was praised as clear and "live"-sounding; the only negative comment was the lack of melody on the record.

Track listing

Personnel
Discharge
 Jeff Janiak – vocals, artwork and layout
 Anthony "Bones" Roberts – lead guitar
 Roy "Rainy" Wainwright – bass guitar
 Terrence "Tezz" Roberts – rhythm guitar
 David Bridgewood – drums

Additional personnel
 Dan Rowley - recording engineer

References 

2016 albums
Discharge (band) albums
Crossover thrash albums
D-beat albums
Anarcho-punk albums